Epiplatys ansorgii is a species of fish in the family Nothobranchiidae, an African rivuline,  
native to fresh water habitats in the southern tributaries of the lower Ogowe River system and then southward to the lower Congo River system in West Africa. 

Etymology
The killifish is named in honor of explorer William John Ansorge (1850–1913), who “obtained” the type specimen.

References

Lazara, K.J., 2000. The killifishes, an annotated checklist, synonymy, and bibliography of recent cyprinodontiform fishes. The Killifish Master Index, 4th Edition. The American Killifish Association, Cincinnati, Ohio, i–xviii, 1–624, appendices A-C.

ansorgii
Taxa named by George Albert Boulenger
Fish described in 1911